Johnston v Leal is an important case in South African contract law, heard in the Appellate Division on 22 February 1980, by Jansen JA, Corbett JA, Miller JA, Van Winsen AJA and Botha AJA, with judgment handed down on 30 May. The case is valuable, inter alia, for its exposition of the parol evidence rule.

References

Books 
 Du Plessis, Jacques, et al. The Law of Contract in South Africa. Edited by Dale Hutchison, Chris-James Pretorius, Mark Townsend and Helena Janisch. Cape Town, Western Cape: Oxford University Press, 2010.

Cases 
 Johnston v Leal 1980 (3) SA 927 (A).

Notes 

1980 in South African law
1980 in case law
Appellate Division (South Africa) cases
South African contract case law